The Dilshad Garden metro station is a station of the Red Line of the Delhi Metro.

Station layout

Facilities

The station has the following facilities:

ATM: PNB ATM near gate no. 1
Toilet: Sulabh Toilet near gate no. 1
Shop/Office: Mahindra near gate no. 1 and Ford, Northern Star Jewellery and Bata Footwears near gate No. 2
Bank: IndusInd Bank on the ground floor
Insurance: ICICI Lombard on the unpaid concourse
Kiosk: SBI Credit Card near gate no. 2
Water: PILO Water Kiosk near gate no. 2
Food / Restaurant: Pizza Hut, Burger King, McDonald's and Haldiram's near gate no. 2 and Bar Shala on the unpaid concourse

Connections

DTC buses:
From the nearby Shahdara Border (Dilshad Garden Metro Station) bus stop, DTC bus routes number 33C, 125EXT, 163, 971 100EXT, 165, 165A, 166, 212, 214CL, 216, 221, 236, 236EXT, 333, 341, 623EXT, 939, 939EXT and 982 serve the station.
A little farther away on the Aradhak Marg, from the Shahdara Border bus stop, DTC bus routes number 0OMS(-), 33, 33A, 33EXT, 33LINKSTL, 33LNKSTL, 33LSTL, 214CL, 243A, 243B, 246, 336A, 3361LNKSTL, 340, 340STL, 396, 542, 534SPL, 623EXT, 623LNKSTL, 971, 982, OMS(+) AC, OMS(-) and YMS(-) serve the station.
Delhi Metro feeder buses:
Feeder bus service ML-53 starts from Dilshad Garden metro station and ends at Mayur Vihar Ph-III. It passes through the following bus stops: Surya Nagar (Indian Oil Petrol Pump), Ram Prastha Xing, Anand Vihar ISBT, Gazi Pur Depot, Gazi Pur Village, Trilok Puri Mod, Dallu Pura Mod, Mayur Vihar Phase-III Xing, Bharti Public School and CRPF camp.
Feeder bus service MC-341 starts from Mayur Vihar Ph-III and ends at Harsh Vihar. It passes through the following bus stops: CRPF Camp, Mayur Vihar III A-1, Bharti Public School, New Kondli A-1, Mayur Vihar Phase-3 Mor, Mayur Vihar Phase-3  X-ing, Ganpati Mandir, Fire Station Dallupura, Dallupura, Kondli, Kalyanpuri Mor, Gazipur Dairy, Gazipur X-ing NH-24, Gazipur Village, Tata Telco, Gazipur Depot, Anand Vihar Metro Station , Anand Vihar ISBT, Ram Prastha X-ing, Ram Prastha Mandir, Surya Nagar, Dilshad Garden Metro Station, Shahdra Border, Shahdra Border, Dilshad Garden J&K Block, Old Seemapuri, Seemapuri Depot, Dlf X-ing, Radha Krishna Mandir, Anand Gram, Tahirpur, Mata Mandir and Sunder Nagri/ Gagan Cinema.

See also
Delhi
List of Delhi Metro stations
Transport in Delhi
Delhi Metro Rail Corporation
Delhi Suburban Railway
List of rapid transit systems in India
List of Metro Systems
National Capital Region (India)

References

External links

 Delhi Metro Rail Corporation Ltd. (Official site)
 Delhi Metro Annual Reports
 
 UrbanRail.Net – descriptions of all metro systems in the world, each with a schematic map showing all stations.

Delhi Metro stations
Railway stations opened in 2008
Railway stations in East Delhi district
2008 establishments in Delhi